The Federation of Printing Information Media Workers' Unions (PIMW, Insatsu Roren) is a trade union representing workers in the printing industry in Japan.

The union was founded on 25 August 1989 and affiliated with the Japanese Trade Union Confederation.  In 1996, it had 22,887 members, which by 2020 had fallen to 20,730.

References

External links

Printing trade unions
Trade unions established in 1989
Trade unions in Japan